Zhangye, formerly romanized as Changyeh or known as Kanchow, is a prefecture-level city in central Gansu Province in the People's Republic of China. It borders Inner Mongolia on the north and Qinghai on the south. Its central district is Ganzhou, formerly a city of the Western Xia and one of the most important outposts of western China.

Name
The city was formerly also known as Ganzhou, named after the sweet waters of its oasis. An alternative theory states that "Gan" was from the Ganjun Hill near the city. The name of province came from a contraction of Ganzhou and Suzhou (modern Jiuquan). The name appears in Marco Polo's Travels under the name Campichu.

Zhangye Commandery was established by Western Han in 111 BC, with the seat at the site of modern Wuwei, Gansu. Etymology of Zhangye is unclear. A popular theory interprets the name Zhangye as "Extending Arm", excerpted from a phrase "to extend the arm of the country through to the Western Realm" documented in Han Shu.

History

Zhangye lies in the centre of the Hexi Corridor. The area is on the frontier of China Proper, protecting it from the nomads of the northwest and permitting its armies access to the Tarim Basin. During the Han Dynasty, Chinese armies were often engaged against the Xiongnu in this area. It was also an important outpost on the Silk Road. Before being over-run by the Mongols, it was dominated by the Western Xia, and before by the Uyghurs from at least the early 10th century. Its relation to the larger Uyghur state of Qocho is obscure, but it may have been a vassal.

The Mongol Yuan Emperor Kublai Khan is said to have been born in the Dafo Temple, Zhangye, now the site of the longest wooden reclining Buddha in China. Marco Polo's journal states that he spent a year in the town during his journey to China.

The pine forests of the Babao Mountains (part of the Qilian range) formerly regulated the flow of the Ruo or Hei Shui, Ganzhou's primary river. By ensuring that the melt-waters lasted throughout the summer, they avoided both early flood and later drought for the valley's farmers. Despite recommendations that they should thus be protected in perpetuity, an Qing imperial official in charge of erecting the poles for China's telegraph network ordered them cleared in the 1880s. Almost immediately, the region became prone to flooding in the summer and draught in the autumn, arousing local resentment.

Christian missionaries arrived in 1879, after Suzhou (modern-day Jiuquan) was found to be too hostile for their settlement.

Administration
Zhangye has one urban district, four counties, one autonomous county, 97 towns, and 978 villages.

Geography
Zhangye is located in central Gansu along the Hexi Corridor, occupying . It takes up the entire breadth of the province, running from Inner Mongolia on the north to Qinghai on the south, but its urban core is at Ganzhou in the oasis formed by the Ruo or Hei River. Its streams, sunlight, and fertile soil make it an important regional agricultural centre, although it was seriously damaged by over-foresting in the 19th century.

Known for its colourful rock formations, it has been voted by Chinese media outlets as one of the most beautiful land-forms in China.

Climate
Zhangye has a cold desert climate (Köppen BWk) with very warm summers and cold and very dry winters. The winters are so dry that snow is extremely rare.

Demographics
Zhangye has a total population of 1,199,515, only 260,000 being urban residents. There are 26 ethnic minorities other than Han represented including many Hui, Yugur and Tibetans.

Transport 
Zhangye is served by China National Highways numbers G30 Expressway, 227 and 312.

Zhangye Railway Station is on the Lanzhou–Xinjiang Railway, located to the north east of the city. A high speed railway station has been constructed on the south west side of the city, Zhangye West Railway Station was opened on the 26th of December, 2014 as part of the Lanzhou–Ürümqi High-Speed Railway.

Zhangye Ganzhou Airport, a combined civilian-military airport, opened in October 2011 with flights to Lanzhou and Xi'an.

Economy
The 2002 GDP was 7.566 billion RMB, almost 9% growth over the previous year. Annual urban income was 5960 RMB,10.4% growth from the previous year and rural income was 3092 RMB, up 5%.

Education
Hexi University is located in Zhangye. Approximately 10,000 students are enrolled at the university.

Sport

Zhangye has hosted a round of the Chinese Rally Championship (CRC) since 2011. It is held on specially constructed roads across the deserts north and to the south of the city. The event attracts over 100 entries regularly, including international drivers. A stadium for side-by-side super special stages has also been constructed.

References

External links

Official Website(Chinese)

 
Prefecture-level divisions of Gansu
Populated places along the Silk Road